Jarl Werner Söderhjelm (26 July 1859 – 16 January 1931) was a Finnish-Swedish linguist, researcher of literary history and diplomat.

Söderhjelm was born in Viipuri. His parents were Procurator Woldemar Söderhjelm and Amanda Olivia Clouberg. Through his family connections, he was exposed to a variety of languages and he took an early interest in literature.

He graduated from Viipuri Classical Lyceum in 1877, graduated as a Bachelor of Philosophy, with a Master's degree in 1882, and as a Licentiate and Doctorate from the Imperial Alexander University in 1885.

Söderhjelm was a docent of the new literature at the University of Helsinki from 1886 to 1889, Romanesque Philology as a Docent from 1889 to 1894 and an Extra Professor from 1894 to 1898.

He worked as a Germanic philologist and professor of Romanesque philology from 1898 to 1908 as Professor of Romanesque Philology in 1908-1913. He applied for the professorship of aesthetics and modern literature in 1910, but was beaten to it by Yrjö Hirn.  Finally Söderhjelm became professor of Finnish and general literary history from 1913 to 1919.

Söderhjelm attended in the Diet of Finland  as a  member from  the clergy from 1904 to 1905. In the early 1900s he belonged to the Young Finnish Party's conservative wing and was a member of the Young People Party Central Committee from 1906 to 1907.

Werner Söderhjelm was married from 1884 to Sigrid Wilhelmina Lönnblad. They had four sons, the most famous being the writer and editor Henning Söderhjelm. His youngest son, J. O. Söderhjelm, served as a  Minister of Justice  during the Winter War. Werner Söderhjelm's sister was Finland's first female professor Alma Söderhjelm. Activist Konni Zilliacus was his cousin.

He died in Helsinki, aged 71.

References

Further reading 

 

1859 births
1931 deaths
Writers from Vyborg
People from Viipuri Province (Grand Duchy of Finland)
Young Finnish Party politicians
Members of the Diet of Finland
Finnish writers in Swedish
Finnish philologists
Linguists from Finland
University of Helsinki alumni
Academic staff of the University of Helsinki
Diplomats from Vyborg